Askole, Askoli, or Askoly is a small town located in Shigar Valley, in the Gilgit–Baltistan region of Pakistan. Askole is located in a  remote region of the Karakoram mountains 3040 meters above sea level. It is notable for being the final settlement before one enters the wilderness of the high Karakorams. 

Askole is the gateway to four of the world's 14 highest peaks known as Eight-thousanders (above 8,000m), and is the launchpad for mountaineering expeditions to K2, Broad Peak and other major mountains.

Expeditions

Expeditions to the following peaks are launched from Askole:

 K2, second highest of the world at 8,611m
 Gasherbrum I, 11th highest of the world at 8,080m.
 Broad Peak, 12th highest of the world at 8,047m.
 Gasherbrum II, 13th highest of the world at 8,035m.
 Gasherbrum III, 7,946m. (Often regarded as a subpeak of Gasherbrum II.)
 Gasherbrum IV, 17th highest of the world at 7,932m.
 Masherbrum (K1), 22nd highest of the world at 7,821m.
 Chogolisa, 36th highest of the world at 7,665m.
 Baintha Brakk, 'The Ogre', 7,285m.
 Muztagh Tower, 7,273m.
 Snow Dome, 7,160m.
 Biarchedi, 6,781m
 Trango Towers, 6,363m, the highest cliffs in the world.
 Mitre Peak, 6,010m.

See also 
Karakoram Highway

References

Populated places in Shigar District